Benjamin Fitzpatrick (June 30, 1802 – November 21, 1869) was the 11th Governor of the U.S. state of Alabama and a United States Senator from that state. He was a Democrat.

Early life
Born in Greene County, Georgia, Fitzpatrick was orphaned at the age of seven and was taken by his sister (Celia Fitzpatrick Baldwin) to Alabama in 1815.

Fitzpatrick helped his brothers manage the land they owned on the Alabama River and served as deputy under the first sheriff of Autauga County. He worked in the law office of Nimrod E. Benson before he was admitted to the bar.

Fitzpatrick studied law and was admitted to the bar in 1821, commencing practice in Montgomery, Alabama. Fitzpatrick served as solicitor of the Montgomery circuit from 1822 to 1823 but moved to his plantation in Autauga County in 1829. He engaged in planting.

Governor of Alabama and Senator for Alabama
Fitzpatrick became Governor of Alabama in 1841 and served until 1845. Later, he was appointed as a Democrat to the U.S. Senate to fill the vacancy caused by the death of Dixon H. Lewis and served from November 25, 1848, to November 30, 1849, when a successor was elected.

He was again appointed on January 14, 1853, and elected on December 12, 1853, to the Senate to fill the vacancy caused by the resignation of William R. King, who had been elected Vice President of the United States, and served from January 14, 1853, to March 3, 1855. He served in that Congress as Chairman of the Committee on Printing and the Committee on Engrossed Bills. He was elected to the Senate again to fill the vacancy caused by the failure of the legislature to elect his successor on November 26, 1855. In that role, he served several times as President pro tempore of the Senate.

Failure of state banks
The country was plagued by economic depression due to the Panic of 1837. Fitzpatrick's predecessor as Governor, Arthur P. Bagby, introduced measures to assist the state banks, but the state legislature rejected most of the measures. All of the state banks were closed by Fitzpatrick.

Vice Presidential nomination
In 1860, Fitzpatrick was nominated for Vice President of the United States by the wing of the Democratic Party that had nominated Stephen A. Douglas of Illinois for president. However, he refused the nomination, and Herschel V. Johnson of Georgia was ultimately nominated. Fitzpatrick withdrew from the Senate on January 21, 1861, following the secession of his home state.

Confederacy
Fitzpatrick did not take a particularly active role in the politics of the Confederacy, although he served as president of the constitutional convention of Alabama in 1865.

Death
He died on his plantation near Wetumpka, Alabama, on November 21, 1869, aged 67.

References

External links

|-

|-

|-

|-

|-

|-

1802 births
1869 deaths
Democratic Party (United States) vice presidential nominees
Democratic Party governors of Alabama
Democratic Party United States senators from Alabama
Governors of Alabama
People from Greene County, Georgia
Politicians from Montgomery, Alabama
Presidents pro tempore of the United States Senate
1860 United States vice-presidential candidates
19th-century American politicians